Hélder José Castro Ferreira (born 5 April 1997) is a Portuguese professional footballer who plays for Cypriot First Division club Anorthosis Famagusta F.C. as a left winger.

Club career

Vitória Guimarães
Ferreira was born in Fafe, Braga District. He spent the better part of his first four seasons as a senior with Vitória de Guimarães' reserves in the LigaPro, making his league debut on 25 November 2015 in a 0–1 home loss against C.D. Feirense when he was still a junior. He scored his first goal on 24 April 2016 to close a 3–3 draw at S.L. Benfica B, adding a brace the following month in the 3–1 home victory over FC Porto B.

Ferreira totalled 25 first-team appearances during his spell at the Estádio D. Afonso Henriques. He scored his only goal on 11 December 2017, in a 1–0 Primeira Liga home defeat of Feirense.

Paços Ferreira
On 27 June 2019, Ferreira signed a three-year contract with newly-promoted F.C. Paços de Ferreira. He netted four times from 33 appearances in the 2020–21 campaign, as the club finished fifth and qualified for the UEFA Europa Conference League.

Anorthosis
On 21 July 2022, Ferreira joined Anorthosis Famagusta F.C. of the Cypriot First Division on a two-year deal.

International career
Ferreira represented Portugal at the 2017 FIFA U-20 World Cup in South Korea, scoring against Zambia (2–1 group-stage loss) in an eventual quarter-final exit.

Career statistics

References

External links

Portuguese League profile 

1997 births
Living people
People from Fafe
Sportspeople from Braga District
Portuguese footballers
Association football wingers
Primeira Liga players
Liga Portugal 2 players
Vitória S.C. B players
Vitória S.C. players
F.C. Paços de Ferreira players
Cypriot First Division players
Anorthosis Famagusta F.C. players
Portugal youth international footballers
Portuguese expatriate footballers
Expatriate footballers in Cyprus
Portuguese expatriate sportspeople in Cyprus